Deportivo Maldonado is a Peruvian football club, playing in the city of Puerto Maldonado, Madre de Dios, Peru.

History
In the 1985 Copa Perú, the club classified to the National Stage, but was eliminated by in the Final Group. In the 1999 Copa Perú, the club classified to the Regional Stage, but was eliminated by Alfonso Ugarte and Deportivo Tintaya. In the 2005 Copa Perú, the club classified to the Regional Stage, but was eliminated in the Group A. In the 2011 Copa Perú, the club classified to the Regional Stage, but was eliminated in the Group A.

Honours

Regional
 Liga Departamental de Madre de Dios:
Winners (9): 1967, 1979, 1984, 1989, 1999, 2017, 2018, 2019, 2022
Runner-up (5): 2005, 2011, 2012, 2014, 2016

 Liga Provincial de Tambopata:
Winners (2): 2011, 2017
Runner-up (5): 2014, 2016, 2018, 2019, 2022

 Liga Distrital de Tambopata:
Winners (5): 2011, 2014, 2016, 2017, 2022
Runner-up (3): 2018, 2019

See also
List of football clubs in Peru
Peruvian football league system

References

External links
 Sitio web en Facebook.

Football clubs in Peru